Hindu Revolution (ISO 15919:  Hindū Krānti ) is a term in Hindu nationalism referring to a sociopolitical movement aiming to overthrow untouchability and casteism to unified social and political community to create the foundations of a modern nation.

Historical background 
The Hindu Revolution is best analysed and evaluated on the background of India's historical situation of domination by external powers. Beginning with Islamic expansionism in the Middle Ages and the establishment of the Delhi Sultanate between 1215 and 1526 CE.
This situation of foreign domination deteriorated dramatically with the arrival of European colonial powers in the 17th century and the acquisition in 1764 of the Diwani of Bengal, Bihar and Orissa by Britain's East India Company.
Following the defeat of the Marathas in 1818, the British became the paramount power on the Indian subcontinent. Local resistance to foreign rule soon mounted, notably finding expression in the Indian Rebellion of 1857.

Causes 
The causes of the Hindu Revolution may be classified into five broad categories: economic, religious, cultural, political and ideological.
 Economic: Historically, the most pressing cause was the economic domination and exploitation by the colonial state, resulting in chronic poverty and recurrent famines; this had already provoked widespread popular uprisings such as that of the sannyasis and peasants of Bengal (1761–1800).

 Religious and cultural: The growing influence of Western religion and culture on Indian society was seen as an assault on Hindu civilisation.
 Political: Political domination by foreign powers was identified as the root cause of India's economic problems, leading to mounting demands for limited self-government and, by 1930, full constitutional independence (Swaraj).
Ideological: an equally important role was played by ideological causes such as the rise of Hindu nationalism and the emergence of a Hindu revolutionary ideology.

At present, the causes remain largely the same. In spite of India's recent economic growth, poverty continues to affect a significant proportion of the population of which the majority are followers of Hinduism.

Widespread corruption has become an additional source of popular dissatisfaction with the existing political system since Independence in 1947. In the 1970s the degradation of the political field under Indira Gandhi's authoritarian regime led to a sharp polarisation of political discourse in India. Hindu revolutionary groups joined a popular anti-Congress opposition front formed around the concept of "Total Revolution" ("Sampoorna Kranti") promoted by Gandhian reformer Jayaprakash (J.P.) Narayan. In particular, this was purportedly aimed at achieving the complete reformation of public morality in India.

Ideology 
The ideology of the Hindu Revolution is essentially nationalist and Hindu revivalist. It may also be characterised as traditional to the extent that it opposes aspects of modernity that are regarded as detrimental to the interests of the Indians or incompatible with Hindu culture and civilisation. In economic terms this has given rise to what has been described by some as "patriotic capitalism" as encapsulated in the 1990s Bharatiya Janata Party (BJP) slogan "Computer chips, yes; potato chips, no". In social and cultural terms, the Hindu revolutionaries aim to curtail several rights and freedoms that are guaranteed to every citizen of the Republic of India. Some of them include the right to profess and propagate ones religion of choice, the right to food and livelihood, the right to equality and the right to free expression.

The principal sources of Hindu revolutionary ideology are Manusmriti and the writings of leading figures such as Swami Vivekananda, Swami Dayananda, Shri Aurobindo Ghose, Veer Savarkar, Guruji Golwalkar and, in particular, Lokmanya Bal Gangadhar Tilak (1856–1920) who is regarded as the Father of India's Revolution.

The fundamental concept of this ideology is Dharma (righteousness or virtuousness). It is traditionally defined as the all-supporting law of the universe which God established at the beginning of time for the benefit of the world and as a guide to right action; and which is followed by the learned and assented to in their heart by the virtuous.

Dharma is seen as the sum total of spiritual, moral and social laws that bind man to his fellow men and to God, ensuring thereby the harmonious and efficient functioning of human society. The revolutionary implication drawn from this is that when society becomes dysfunctional as a result of a decline in righteousness (Dharma) and a rise in unrighteousness (Adharma) it is necessary to restore the rule of righteousness as a means of rendering society functional again.

The interpretation of history as a conflict between the forces of righteousness (Dharma) and their opposite (Adharma) leads on to the concept of struggle for the restoration of righteousness (Dharma Yuddha) as a moral and religious obligation incumbent upon all faithful and patriotic Hindus.

The period of Indian history prior to Western domination is regarded as a golden age which is sought to be restored by a return to the rule of righteousness (Dharma). Scriptural passages such as Bhagavadgita 4.7-8 are seen as a divine promise in respect of restoration of the rule of Dharma and adduced in support of the concept of Dharma Yuddha or revolutionary effort.

In political terms the ultimate aim of the Revolution is the establishment of a Hindu State (Hindi: Hindu Rajya) as already formulated by Lokmanya Bal Gangadhar Tilak in the early 1900s (see also Savarkar, V. D., Hindu Rashtra-Darshan, 1949.) or what Mahatma Gandhi referred to as Ram Rajya (literally, Kingdom of God on earth), in emulation of the example set by divine avatars such as Krishna and Rama.

It is to be noted, however, that mainstream Hindu revolutionary ideology does not interpret this Hindu State as a theocracy, but as an ideal society characterised by adherence to universal values of virtue, harmony and justice, or what is termed "Innate Law". Consequently, a Hindu State is not defined as a theocratic state but as a Righteous State (Dharma Rajya) i.e., a state governed according to the universal principle of righteousness or Dharma.

Universal welfare or Lokasamgraha is another important concept derived from Hindu sacred texts. The entire nation and, by extension, the entire human race is regarded as a unity, the revolutionary aim being to ensure the welfare of the world.

However, the ideals of the Hindu Revolutionary movement are largely contradictory to the Universal Declaration of Human Rights, Constitution of India and other modern interpretations of civil liberties with respect to the right to profess and propagate ones religion of choice, the right to food and livelihood, the right to equality and the right to free expression.

A further key concept is that of Hindutva (Hinduness) which is defined as a feeling of belonging to the Hindu religion and culture and the Hindu community. The term was coined by Lokmanya Bal Gangadhar Tilak and developed by Veer Savarkar in his Hindutva. As such, all Indians are considered by the Hindu Revolutionaries to belong to Hinduism.

Genesis and development 
The present Hindu revolutionary movement is seen as a continuation of the Revolutionary War of 1857. However, its actual beginnings may be dated to the last decade of the 19th century in which the revolutionary seeds of the 1857 events began to germinate, providing fresh impetus to India's national struggle of liberation from colonial rule. Some of the first manifestations of this were protests against economic exploitation and a growing call for swadeshi, i.e. Indian-made goods, in particular, cotton cloth to replace foreign imports. This was linked to the concept of boycott (bahishkar) of foreign goods and culminated in the demand for swaraj (self-rule). This demand was formulated by Lokmanya Tilak and agreed upon by Lala Lajpat Rai, Bipin Chandra Pal and Aurobindo Ghose in 1905 and proclaimed by Dadabhai Naoroji in his presidential address at the Calcutta Congress in 1906. It remained the principal aim of the movement until Independence in 1947.

In the post-Independence period the focus of the movement shifted to the domination of the political field by the Congress party and its allies. As the situation has not found resolution and the ultimate goal – the establishment of a Hindu State or Ideal Society (Ram Rajya or  Rāma Rājya ) – is yet to be achieved, the movement remains an ongoing process.

Like most revolutionary movements, the Hindu Revolution comprises both moderate and extremist undercurrents. Although the primary methods of struggle employed by the movement have been constitutional and agitational, it has not been without its more radical factions which have attempted to achieve political goals through the use of armed force. The starting point of the armed struggle is generally accepted as having been provided by the guerrilla campaign of 1879 which was led by Vasudev Balwant Phadke and aimed to establish a Hindu Republic in India. In the wake of these events, various underground groups emerged in the 1890s, aiming to initiate a national insurrection through acts of assassination carried out against leading representatives of the colonial state. A notable example of this was the assassination of the Plague Commissioner of Poona (Pune), Mr. Rand, on 22 June 1897 (the diamond jubilee day of Queen Victoria's coronation). The Chapekar brothers and their associates who were involved in these actions have been described as "the founders of the revolutionary movement in India" and "the first to invoke the Gita in support of political action of that kind".

The period of 1905-1910 marked the beginning of a new phase in which the movement began to take on nationwide dimensions. Popular outrage at the British partition of Bengal; Muslim-Hindu communal violence; the trial and deportation of Lokmanya Tilak; and the influence of revolutionary events outside India (notably in Russia), led to waves of mass political meetings, mass protests, street demonstrations, political strikes and riots.  This phase culminated in the assassination of official personalities, including Sir Curzon Wyllie of the India Office, "Pandit" Jackson, the collector of Nasik and William Ashe, collector of Tirunelveli. Assassination attempts were carried out on East Bengal Lieutenant-Governor Bamfylde Fuller, Calcutta Chief Presidency Magistrate Kingsford, Viceroy Minto and Viceroy Hardinge (who was injured in a bomb attack in New Delhi).

The First World War (1914–1918) was seen as an opportunity to forge alliances with foreign powers opposed to Britain, such as Germany and Turkey, and a "Provisional Government of Free India" under Raja Mahendra Pratap was set up in Kabul in December 1915. However, counter-revolutionary measures such as the Anarchical and Revolutionary Crimes Acts (which came into force from 2 March 1919) and heavy police repression combined with Mahatma Gandhi's non-violent Non-Cooperation Campaign of 1920–1922, acted as a brake on the armed struggle. Gandhi's promise of obtaining Swaraj within a year by non-violent means failed to materialize and the Revolution lost its vital momentum.

Renewed revolutionary upsurges in the 1920s and 1940s continued until Independence without reaching insurrection levels. Nevertheless, armed action particularly as carried on by the revolutionary Indian National Army (INA) is acknowledged to have had a significant effect on the course and outcome of India's national freedom struggle. Although Independence was finally achieved in 1947, the country's accompanying partition into India and Pakistan was a traumatic event that was seen as a serious setback to the national movement and a heavy blow to India's territorial integrity. Hindu radicals blamed this development on Mahatma Gandhi's policies and this led to his assassination in January 1948.

In the post-Independence period the movement saw a marked return to constitutional methods. Attempts were made to gain a larger share of political power through the pro-Hindu Bharatiya Jana Sangh (BJS), founded in 1951, and from 1980 through its successor, the Bharatiya Janata Party (BJP) which succeeded in forming a coalition government in 1998–2004.

At the same time, however, frustration at the lack of progress in the political field has led to a revival in militant Hinduism, a notable manifestation of which is the Ram Janmabhoomi movement. The movement campaigns for the reconstruction of the Ram Temple (Ram Mandir) in the holy city of Ayodhya and led to the demolition of the Babri Masjid (Babri Mosque) in 1992.

More recently, militant underground organisations have attempted to resume armed struggle as a means of achieving political change. Among these, the Pune-based Abhinav Bharat group – named after Veer Savarkar's original organisation – has reportedly been campaigning for the establishment of a Hindu State or Nation (Hindu Rashtra).

See also 

 Hindutva
 Communalism (South Asia)
 Revolutionary Movement for Indian Independence
 Indian Independence Movement
 List of Hindu Empires and Dynasties

References

External links 
The Hindu Revolution
Hindu Jagruti

Hindu nationalism